The Newport Built-up area (previously known in official statistics as the Newport Urban Area) is an area of land defined by the United Kingdom Office for National Statistics (ONS) for population monitoring purposes.  It is an urban conurbation and is not coterminous with the city boundaries.  It consists of the urban area centred on Newport as well as contiguous settlements in the eastern and western valleys extending north of the city – including Cwmbran, Pontypool, Risca, Abercarn and Blackwood. It does however exclude physically detached urban areas within the city boundaries, such as Marshfield.

The detailed methodology of the process used across the UK by ONS in 2011 is set out in 2011 Built-up Areas - Methodology and Guidance, published in June 2013. It is summarised as "..a ‘bricks and mortar’ approach, with areas defined as built-up land with a minimum area of 20 hectares (0.2 km2 / 0.077 mile2), while settlements within 200 metres of each other are linked. Built-up area sub-divisions are also identified to provide greater detail in the data, especially in the larger conurbations."

The total population of the built-up area defined on this basis in 2011 was 306,844, making Newport the 23rd largest conurbation in England and Wales and the 2nd largest in Wales.

Subdivisions
The ONS provides sub-division statistics for the Newport Urban Area

See also
List of conurbations in the United Kingdom
List of Welsh principal areas by population
List of Welsh principal areas by area
List of localities in Wales by population

References

Geography of Newport, Wales
Urban areas of Wales
Demographics of Wales